A monogram is a motif made by overlapping or combining two or more letters or other graphemes to form one symbol. Monograms are often made by combining the initials of an individual or a company, used as recognizable symbols or logos. A series of uncombined initials is properly referred to as a cypher (e.g. a royal cypher) and is not a monogram.

History

Monograms first appeared on coins, as early as 350 BC. The earliest known examples are of the names of Greek cities which issued the coins, often the first two letters of the city's name. For example, the monogram of Achaea consisted of the letters alpha (Α) and chi (Χ) joined together.

Monograms have been used as signatures by artists and craft workers on paintings, sculptures and pieces of furniture, especially when guilds enforced measures against unauthorized participation in the trade. A famous example of a monogram serving as an artist's signature is the "AD" used by Albrecht Dürer.

Christograms

Over the centuries, monograms of the name of Jesus Christ have been used as Christian symbols. The IX monogram consists of the initial Greek letters of the name "Jesus Christ," "I" for Ιησούς, (Jesus in Greek) and "X" for Χριστος (Christ in Greek). The "IHS" Christogram, denoting the first three letters of the Greek name of Jesus, is usually written as a cypher, but sometimes as a monogram.

Perhaps the most significant Christogram is the Chi Rho, formed from the first two letters of Χριστος. The symbol was used by the Roman emperor Constantine I (r. 306–337) as part of a military standard.

Royal monograms

Signum manus (sometimes also known as Chrismon) refers to the medieval practice, current from the Merovingian period until the 14th century in the Frankish Empire and its successors, of signing a document or charter with a special type of monogram or royal cypher.

Monograms of the names of monarchs are used as part of the insignia of public organizations in kingdoms, such as on police badges. This indicates a connection to the ruler. However, the royal cypher, so familiar on pillar boxes, is not technically a monogram, since the letters are not combined.

Royal monograms often appear on coins, frequently surmounted by a crown. Countries that have employed this device in the past include Bulgaria, Great Britain, Russia, Sweden and many German states. Today, several Danish coins carry the monogram of Margrethe II, while the current Norwegian 1 Krone coin has the "H5" monogram of Harald V on the obverse. The only countries using the Euro to have a royal monogram as their national identifying mark are Belgium and Monaco. In Thailand, royal monograms appear on the individual flag for each major royal family member.

Individual monograms

An individual's monogram may appear in stylized form on stationery, luggage, clothing, or other personalized items. These monograms may have two or three letters.

A basic 3-letter monogram has the initial of the individual's last name (surname) set larger, or with some special treatment in the center, while the first name initial appears to the left of it and the middle name initial appears to the right of it. There is a difference in how this is written for men and women. For example, if the individual's name is Mary Ann Jones, and Jones is the surname, then the arrangement of letters would be thus: MJA, with the surname initial set larger in the center, the M for Mary to the left and the A for Ann to the right. Traditionally, individual monograms for men are based on the order of the name. The name Kyle George Martin would be written (KGM).

Married or engaged couples may use two-letter monograms of their entwined initials, for example on wedding invitations. Married couples may also create three-letter monograms incorporating the initial of their shared surname. For example, the monogram MJA might be used for Michael and Alice Jones. However, monogramming etiquette for the married couple varies according to the item being monogrammed. Linens, for example, typically list the woman's given initial first, followed by the couple's shared surname initial and then the man's given initial (AJM).
Monograms can often be found on custom dress shirts where they can be located in a number of different positions.

Some personal monograms have become famous symbols in their own right and instantly recognizable to many, such as J.R.R. Tolkien's monogram.

Other monograms

Some companies and organizations adopt a monogram for a logo, usually with the letters of their acronym. For example, as well as having an official seal, and the Texas Longhorns logo, the University of Texas at Austin uses a "UT" monogram (in the same color as the Longhorns logo, burnt orange). The New York Yankees baseball team also uses a monogram on their ball cap insignia.  The Consolidated Edison logo, with a rounded "E" nested inside a "C," has been described as a "classic emblem."

Many fashion companies have a monogram for a logo, including Louis Vuitton and Fendi. The connected "CC" company logo, created by Coco Chanel, is one of the most recognizable monograms internationally.

The victor is a monogram of the Latin  or Spanish  painted on Spanish and Hispanic universities to celebrate a student receiving a doctorate.

Athletes have also been known to brand merchandise with their monogram logo; notably Tiger Woods and Roger Federer.

Resistance symbols in wartime 

A notable example of a royal monogram is the H7 monogram of King Haakon VII of Norway. While in exile during World War II, Haakon VII spearheaded the Norwegian resistance to the German occupation, and H7 became a symbol used by the Norwegian populace to mark solidarity and loyalty to the King, and adherence to the Norwegian resistance movement. The act of drawing or creating a H7 symbol in German-occupied Norway was punishable by imprisonment.

Similarly, in Poland during the war, the "PW" monogram was used as a resistance symbol, known as 'The Anchor', due to its characteristic shape. Its meaning varied, as the initials were useful for many different slogans, such as 'Poland Fights', 'Warsaw Uprising', 'Polish Army', and others. Like the Norwegian example above, its use was punished by the Nazi occupation authorities.

Zirkel

In the Germanosphere, certain student societies (Studentenverbindung) use monograms known as Zirkel ("circle", as in "circle of friends"), consisting of the initial letter of the organization's name and/or the letters v,c,f or e,f,v, together with an exclamation mark if the society is still active.

Japanese

A Japanese rebus monogram is a monogram in a particular style, which spells a name via a rebus, as a form of Japanese wordplay or visual pun. Today they are most often seen in corporate logos or product logos.

Gallery

See also
Siglum
Signum manus
Interrobang
Huaya
Ligature
Varsity letter
Nicolas Verrien, 17th-century French monogram designer
Sigil (magic)
Tughra

References

Monograms